The Honda RC211V is a 990 cc (60 cu in) four-stroke race motorcycle from HRC (Honda Racing Corporation) developed in 2001 to replace the two-stroke Honda NSR500.

It was developed as a direct result of major changes to the regulations for the World Championship motorcycle road racing  class  for the 2002 season.

The model name designates the following:
 RC = Honda's traditional racing prefix for 4-stroke bikes
 211 = first works bike of the 21st century
 V = V engine

The RC211V was replaced in 2007 by the RC212V.

2002
In 2002, the debut year of the RC211V, Honda and Valentino Rossi dominated by winning the constructors' championship by more than 100 points over their nearest rival. The bike underwent small modifications over the season, but it did not as yet have traction control so much as a handlebar-mounted power management system with three settings for different needs during a race.

Factory riders: Valentino Rossi, Tohru Ukawa
Satellite riders (in the latter part of the season): Alex Barros, Daijiro Kato

2003
Among other changes in 2003, power was increased from about 200 to 240 bhp. Traction control was also added.

Factory riders: Valentino Rossi, Nicky Hayden, Daijiro Kato, Sete Gibernau
Satellite riders: Max Biaggi, Tohru Ukawa, Makoto Tamada, Ryuichi Kiyonari

2004
For 2004, a new, inverted rear suspension link was added, and a new exhaust was introduced at the Sachsenring round. The RC211V riders were unable to keep Rossi (now on a Yamaha YZR-M1) from winning his fourth premier-class championship, and no clear candidate appeared to take over Rossi's role of lead development rider for Honda.

Factory riders: Alex Barros, Nicky Hayden, Sete Gibernau
Satellite riders: Max Biaggi, Colin Edwards, Makoto Tamada

2005
2005 would be the first time in four years Honda lost the constructors' championship in the premier class. The RC211V chassis underwent frequent revision and rewelding, with reversions to the 2003 design. After the race at Brno, Honda tested a new bike which both Hayden and Biaggi said was an improvement, and was thereafter known as the "Brno bike".

Factory riders: Max Biaggi, Nicky Hayden, Sete Gibernau
Satellite riders: Alex Barros, Makoto Tamada, Marco Melandri, Troy Bayliss

2006
In 2006, the RC211V came in three flavors: the "Brno bike" to be ridden by Hayden, a 2006 bike with a special chassis for Pedrosa, and a 2006 bike to be ridden by Melandri, Elías, Stoner, and Tamada; Melandri and Stoner eventually got the special Pedrosa chassis. Hayden's RC211V was modified to put the crankshaft higher, the clutch and gearbox lower, and to lengthen the swing arm; the goal was to centralize mass and improve stability. After the Jerez round, Hayden was the fastest Honda rider in testing. At the British GP, HRC gave Hayden a new chassis, but Hayden complained that he didn't have enough time to test it. Hayden had started the year with the same clutch as Pedrosa, but four rounds later it was shelved in favor of a clutch Hayden had used in previous years; at the Brno round, he had a problem with the clutch that contributed to a 9th-place finish. Honda and Hayden had difficulty finding a clutch that would allow a good launch at the start but also work well throughout the race. Hayden eventually won the rider championship and Honda reclaimed the constructors' championship.

Factory riders: Nicky Hayden, Dani Pedrosa
Satellite riders: Makoto Tamada, Marco Melandri, Toni Elías, Casey Stoner

The RC211V was retired when rules dictated a switch to  capacity; Honda's bike for 2007 was the RC212V.

Successes

In five seasons of MotoGP racing the Honda RC211V won 48 races out of 82 (58.5%) contested. It also won three-rider world championships (Rossi 2002, 2003 and Hayden 2006) and four constructor titles (2002, 2003, 2004, 2006).

Specifications

Specifications as per manufacturer:

Complete MotoGP results

Motorcycle summary 
Title won 
Rider: (Valentino Rossi)  (Nicky Hayden ) 
Constructors: 
Race Won: 48 
2002: Rossi 11, Barros 2, Ukawa 1 (14 in total) 
2003: Rossi 9, Gibernau 4, Biaggi 2 (15 in total) 
2004: Gibernau 4, Tamada 2, Biaggi 1 (7 in total) 
2005: Melandri 2, Hayden 1, Barros 1 (4 in total) 
2006: Melandri 3, Pedrosa 2, Hayden 2, Elias 1 (8 in total)

Poles: 46 
2002: Rossi 7, Barros 1, Kato 1 (9 in total) 
2003: Rossi 9, Biaggi 3, Sete Gibernau 1 (13 in total) 
2004: Gibernau 5, Tamada 2, Biaggi 1 (8 in total) 
2005: Gibernau 5, Hayden 4, Barros 1
(10 in total) 
2006: Pedrosa 4, Hayden 1, Stoner 1 (6 in total)

RC211V results 
(key) (results in bold indicate pole position; results in italics indicate fastest lap)
(the teams are bold indicate factory teams; the riders are bold indicate the rider rode a factory bikes in the satellite teams)

See also
List of motorcycles by type of engine

References

External links
 Honda Worldwide | MotoGP – official Honda MotoGP site

RC211V
Grand Prix motorcycles